Phyllonotus is a genus of medium to large sized predatory sea snails. These are carnivorous marine gastropod molluscs in the family Muricidae, the murexes or rock snails.

In 2011 Phyllonotus was raised to the status of genus from its former state as subgenus of Chicoreus

Species
 Phyllonotus erythrostomus (Swainson, 1831)
 Phyllonotus eversoni (D'Attilio, Myers & Shasky, 1987)
 Phyllonotus globosus Emmons, 1858
 Phyllonotus guyanensis Garrigues & Lamy, 2016
 Phyllonotus margaritensis (Abbott, 1958)
 Phyllonotus mexicanus (Petit de la Saussaye, 1852)
 Phyllonotus oculatus (Reeve, 1845)
 Phyllonotus peratus Keen, 1960
 Phyllonotus pomum (Gmelin, 1791)
 Phyllonotus regius (Swainson, 1821)
 Phyllonotus salutensis Garrigues & Lamy, 2016
 Phyllonotus whymani Petuch & Sargent, 2011
Species brought into synonymy 
 Phyllonotus acanthophora A. Adams, 1863: synonym of Ocenebra acanthophora (A. Adams, 1863)
 Phyllonotus coronatus A. Adams, 1863 (nomen dubium): synonym of  Pteropurpura (Ocinebrellus) falcata (G.B. Sowerby II, 1834)
 Phyllonotus brassica (Lamarck, 1822) accepted as Hexaplex brassica (Lamarck, 1822)
 Phyllonotus duplex (Röding, 1798): synonym of Hexaplex duplex (Röding, 1798)
 Phyllonotus superbus (G.B. owerby III, 1889): synonym of  Chicomurex superbus (G.B. Sowerby III, 1889)
 Phyllonotus trunculus (Linnaeus, 1758): synonym of Hexaplex trunculus (Linnaeus, 1758)
 Phyllonotus unifasciatus A. Adams, 1863 (nomen dubium): synonym of   Pteropurpura (Ocinebrellus) falcata (G.B. Sowerby II, 1834)

References

 Merle D., Garrigues B. & Pointier J.-P. (2011) Fossil and Recent Muricidae of the world. Part Muricinae. Hackenheim: Conchbooks. 648 pp.

External links
 Swainson W. (1829-1833). Zoological Illustrations, or original figures and descriptions of new, rare, or interesting animals, selected chiefly from the classes of ornithology, entomology, and conchology, and arranged according to their apparent affinities. Second series. London: Baldwin & Cradock. (Vol. 1-3)

Muricinae